Mieczysław Halka-Ledóchowski (IPA: /mʲɛˈtʂɨswaf ˈxalka lɛduˈxɔfski/), (29 October 1822 – 22 July 1902) was born in Górki (near Sandomierz) in Russian controlled Congress Poland to Count Josef Ledóchowski and Maria Zakrzewska. He was uncle to Saint Ursula Ledóchowska, the Blessed Maria Teresia (Theresa) Ledóchowska and Father Włodzimierz Ledóchowski, General Superior of the Society of Jesus.

Early life
Born 29 October 1822, he was named after Mieszko I, the first Christian prince of Poland.  
After studying at Radom, at the age of nineteen, he entered the seminary at Warsaw run by the Missionaries of St.  Vincent de Paul. He then studied at the Gregorian University in Rome and entered the Jesuit Accademia dei Nobili Ecclesiastici to prepare to work in the diplomatic corps of the Holy See. Ledóchowski was ordained priest on 13 July 1845. He earned two doctorates, in theology and civil and canon law.

Diplomatic career
Father Ledóchowski became domestic prelate of Pope Pius IX in 1846, and in 1847 auditor of the papal nunciature at Lisbon. In 1857 he became papal delegate in Bogota for an area that encompassed present-day Colombia, Venezuela, Ecuador, Peru and Bolivia. In 1861, he was named titular Archbishop of Thebes and papal nuncio at Brussels.

Primate
After returning to Poland in 1864, he was named coadjutor with right of succession to Primate Leon Przyłuski, and two years later, upon Przyłuski's death, despite the opposition of the Prussian authorities, he was appointed archbishop of Gniezno and Archbishop of Poznań, (both cities then a part of the Prussian Province of Posen).

In 1873, the Prussian government began the implementation of Kulturkampf policies against the Roman Catholic Church as well as the Polish culture (using Polish language in particular). In the aftermath the Prussian government forbade the use of Polish in instruction in the Province of Posen. Archbishop Ledóchowski urgently protested this order, and ultimately issued a circular ordering the religion teachers at higher educational institutes to use German in their teachings to the higher classes but to preserve Polish in their teachings to the lower classes.

The religious instructors obediently followed the archbishop's order and were subsequently deposed by the Prussian government. Ledóchowski's refusal to cede control of the seminaries of Gniezno and Poznan to the Prussian authorities eventually led to their closure. After repeated fines for outlawed activity, the government demanded Ledóchowski's resignation. The archbishop responded that no temporal court could deprive him of an office granted to him by God, and he was jailed in the Ostrów Wielkopolski prison in February 1874.

In March 1875 the Pope appointed him as Cardinal. Ledóchowski was released and banished and thereafter ruled his see from Rome through secret emissaries. Towards the end of his life he began to have serious vision problems due to cataracts. He resigned in 1885. In 1892 he became Prefect of the Congregation for the Evangelization of Peoples, an office which he held until his death, on 22 July 1902.

See also

 Our Lady of La Salette
 Wlodimir Ledóchowski

References

External links
 Virtual tour Gniezno Cathedral 
List of Primates of Poland 

 
 

1822 births
1902 deaths
People from Sandomierz County
19th-century Polish cardinals
Austrian Poles
Bishops of Poznań
Burials at Poznań Cathedral
Diplomats of the Holy See
Our Lady of La Salette
Cardinals created by Pope Pius IX
Members of the Congregation for the Propagation of the Faith
Ledóchowski family
Latin archbishops of Thebes
Catholic clergy of the Prussian partition